Alice in Wonderland and Through the Looking-Glass is a 2001 stage adaptation of Lewis Carroll's 1865 novel Alice's Adventures in Wonderland, and the 1871 novel Through the Looking-Glass. It was written by Adrian Mitchell.

Play inception 
Mitchell's adaptation originated as a commission from the Royal Shakespeare Company. In his version, Mitchell uses a fictionalized version of the biographically famous "Golden Afternoon" on the 4th of July 1862, when Charles Dodgson (Lewis Carroll) first told the stories that would become the Alice novels to his friend Canon Robinson Duckworth and the Liddell children, Alice, Lorina, and Edith. Dodgson wrote the stories down, and much later, presented the manuscript of Alice's adventures Underground to Alice Liddell in November 1864.

Synopsis

Act 1

Prologue 
On the 4th of July 1862, Charles Dodgson (Lewis Carroll) , his friend the Canon Duckworth, and the three Liddell sisters, Alice Liddell, Lorina Liddell, and Edith Liddell, drift down the Oxford stretch of the river Thames. Alice Liddell asks for a story, as all disembark from the boat, Dodgson begins to tell one. As Dodgson and company sit on a riverbank and listen to the story he is spinning, Alice Liddell becomes the fictional "Alice".

Alice's adventures in Wonderland 
"Alice" steps forward, suddenly seeing an unusual rabbit brush past her, wearing a waistcoat and a watch, and complaining that it is late. Alice follows it across the field and it disappears into a rabbit hole. Alice follows him and falls deep into the centre of the earth, musing on the workings of physics and daydreaming about her cat Dinah, while the Company sing of Alice's predicament ("Down, Down, Down").

Landing in a heap of leaves, Alice sees the white rabbit running away, but he vanishes when she gets near to him. Now alone in a hall of doors, Alice is drawn to a lovely garden through a tiny door which is too small to fit through. On locking the door again she notices a glass table on which a cake marked eat me rests. Alice eats the cake and grows to the size of the hall. Alarmed at her sudden change in size and the fact the garden is more further away than ever, Alice cries. The White Rabbit returns, holding a pair of gloves and a fan, but drops them and runs away when he sees Alice. On a shelf high up Alice notices a bottle marked drink me, which Alice does. She shrinks rapidly and tries the garden door again, but it is locked. In vain she tries to climb up the table leg to reach the golden key. Reflecting on her loneliness she tries to recite an old song, Issac Watts's Against Idleness and Mischief, but instead ends up reciting a bizarre parody, How Doth the Little Crocodile.

After seeing the crocodile from the poem appear, a startled Alice falls into a pool of her own tears, where she meets a mouse who is offended by both cats and dogs. Despite being afraid of Alice's remarks on both subjects the mouse invites her to listen to his history when they reach the shore.

On the shore Alice meets several animals who appear quite familiar to her. The Duck, the Dodo, the Lory and the Eaglet all have exaggerated characteristics of Duckworth, Dodgson, Lorina and Edith. The Dodo proclaims that the best way to get dry would be to run a caucus race, which is a race which no one wins and all run round in a circle. After the race is over he declares that everyone has won, so all must have a prize. Everyone turns to Alice, who finds a packet of sweets in her pinafore pocket and hands them out as prizes. After the festivities finish, all sit and listen to the story of the mouse. The story is nonsensical and Alice, in an effort to understand the tale, accidentally insults the mouse. He storms off, enraged. Alice lapses into daydreaming about her cat Dinah and this scares everyone else away too. Left alone, Alice decides to try and grow bigger again so she can reach the lovely garden.

Alice comes across and identity obsessed Caterpillar who insists on asking who she is. After all the changes she has gone through and all she has witnessed, Alice isn't sure if she is the same person as she was this morning. After the Caterpillar and Alice argue about the emotional effects of size changing, he bids her to recite You are Old Father William by Robert Southey, a popular Victorian child's recitation poem. Father William and son rush into the scene, a double act anxious to avoid their routine being stolen. They perform the poem as Alice recites. The Caterpillar declares that Alice's recitation was wrong entirely and offers her one piece of advice, to eat the mushroom to make her grow taller or shorter. He falls asleep as Alice breaks off two pieces and experiments with her size. Finally at a reasonable height, Alice thanks the now-tiny caterpillar and wonders through a wood.

Outside a grand house, Alice observes a Fish-Footman and Frog-Footman handing a letter to each other for the Duchess, from the Queen of Hearts, to play croquet. After laughing at the bizarre way the pair complete this ritual, Alice gets drawn into a conversation with the Frog-Footman on the ethics of door knocking. As a plate spins out of the house, the Frog-Footman remarks he will sit outside for days and days doing nothing. Alice is infuriated and hurries inside the noisy house.

Inside the house is a manic and dangerous kitchen, featuring a deranged cook, irritable Duchess, a strange baby and a grinning Cheshire Cat, Alice argues with the Duchess over the day and night structure of the earth, observes the curious Cheshire cat who grins from ear to ear constantly, ducks from plates thrown by the cook and is alarmed when the Duchess seems to imply her baby is a pig. After a surreal lullaby ("Wow, Wow, Wow") is sung to the baby, Alice is given it as the Duchess hurries off to prepare for croquet with the Queen of Hearts. Alice takes the child away, worrying about its safety, but is taken aback when the child turns into a pig and she has to let it go.

Seeing the Cheshire Cat in a tree in a wood, Alice asks it for advice on whom to visit next, the cat advises her to visit the Hatter or the March Hare. Although it doesn't matter which she visits as they are both mad. Alice realizes she doesn't want to be among mad people and the cat remarks that everyone in Wonderland is mad, even her. It justifies why its mad and disappears leaving only a grin. Faced with an unenviable decision, Alice decides to visit the March Hare as she's seen hatters before.

Coming across a tea-table in front of a house where the roof is shaped like ears, Alice sees the March Hare along with a Hatter and a Dormouse taking tea. Joining them, they angrily tell her there's no room at the table, even though there is. Irritated, Alice decides to sit down anyway. The March Hare delights in confusing her and the Hatter asks an impossible riddle with no answer. Taking out his watch the hatter complains that the March Hare has tampered with it by putting butter in it. It turns out that time itself has stopped at the tea party as a result of the Hatter's quarrel with time itself. Because of a bad recitation at the Queen of Hearts's concert, the savage Queen claimed he was murdering the time. Time and the Hatter fell out and as a punishment its always six o clock for the Hatter now. The Hatter laments his lost friendship with time and sings a little of the recitation he sang at the concert, which is a distorted parody of a popular nursery rhyme ("Twinkle, Twinkle, little bat...") The March Hare suggests the subject be changed and the Hatter votes for a story. After pinching and pulling the sleepy Dormouse awake, the March Hare and Hatter beg for a story, whilst Alice asks politely. The Dormouse tells a bizarre tale of three sisters who lived in a well and drew treacle from it. A curious Alice questions the logic of the story and is insulted by the Hatter. Angered, she turns to leave. No one notices her going, and she looks back to see the Hatter and March Hare trying to put the Dormouse in the teapot.

Seeing a door with a tree in it, Alice goes through and finds herself back in the hall of doors. She takes the gold key off the glass table and opens the door to the lovely garden. Now the right size, Alice bounds into the lovely garden at last.

At the entrance to the garden, Alice spies three card gardeners arguing amongst themselves, busily painting white roses on a rosebush red. When asked why, the gardeners reveal that they planted a white rose tree by mistake and if the Queen of Hearts were to find out, she would order the gardeners to be beheaded. At this moment the Queen and her procession enter, and terrified, the gardeners lie flat on their faces. Alice observes the procession spotting a familiar face- the white rabbit, among the guests. The Queen and King take an interest to Alice and ask her her name, Alice obliges and curtsies politely, but the Queen of Hearts is angered by Alice's steadfastness when she asks her who the gardeners are, and Alice replies that she doesn't know. The Queen calls for her head, but the King begs her to reconsider, pointing out that Alice is only a child. The Queen takes her anger out on the three gardeners instead, who are sentenced to be beheaded when she realizes the rose-tree's roses are white and not red. Alarmed, Alice hides the gardeners so the executioner can't find them.

Alice is invited by the Queen to join a distorted game of croquet in which the mallets are flamingos, the arches cards and the balls hedgehogs. She bumps into The White Rabbit who reveals to her that the Duchess is in prison, but is interrupted by the start of the croquet before he can divulge any more information. Alice struggles with a hedgehog as a ball and flamingo as a mallet, the Queen orders everyone in sight to be executed, and the players cheat constantly. Annoyed, Alice is on the verge of walking away when the Cheshire Cat's head appears in the sky. Happy that she has a friend to talk to Alice spends no time in complaining about the croquet game, nearly insulting the Queen as she walks past her in the process. The King asks to be introduced to the cat, but the cat is less than complimentary about him. Bewildered the King asks for the cat to be removed, sparking a debate between the executioner and himself. Alice eventually settles the argument by suggesting the Duchess be called, as it is her cat. The executioner rushes off to fetch the Duchess from prison. As everyone watches, the Cheshire Cat's head disappears, and by the time the Duchess has arrived, it has gone entirely.

Walking with the Duchess, Alice is pleased to find her in a better mood than when they last met. The Duchess reveals her love of nonsensical morals but stops in her tracks when the Queen of Hearts appears in front of her. The Queen issues an ultimatum, either the Duchess or her head must be off. The Duchess hurries away. Alice and the Queen go back to the croquet, where the Queen orders everyone to be executed. Now in a better mood, she takes Alice to see the Mock Turtle, despite the fact that Alice has never seen or heard if one.

At the seashore Alice comes across a Gryphon who takes her to the miserable mock turtle, who is miserable because has nothing to be miserable about. The two reminisce about their schooldays under the sea and introduce Alice to a dance and a song called the Lobster Quadrille ("The Lobster Quadrille"). After an argument about the song, the Mock Turtle decides to distract the Gryphon and Alice by singing another, this time about soup ("Beautiful Soup"). A fanfare is heard and the White Rabbit scurries onstage, announcing that the trial is beginning. The Gryphon refuses to tell Alice any more information regarding the trial and drags her away from the seashore. Meanwhile, the Mock Turtle still sings.

In the royal Court, the trial of the Knave of Hearts is held, featuring every resident of Wonderland as spectators, the King of Hearts as judge, and the White Rabbit as herald. After the accusation, based on the famous rhyme is recited by the White Rabbit, the Hatter is called to give evidence. The Hatter's evidence is confused and pointless, on account of his nervousness on being in front of the Queen again. The evidence soon dissolves into the Hatter and the King arguing about spelling. A suspicious Queen recognises the Hatter, and declares he should be beheaded once the trial is over. The next witness, the Duchess's Cook, fares no better as she violently refuses to give evidence. The cross examining is derailed by the Dormouse talking in its sleep. As per usual the Queen of Hearts calls for it to be beheaded. By the time everything settles down again, the cook has disappeared. Alice wonders who the next witness will be and is extremely alarmed when she is called. She states that she knows nothing about what's happened and the King stupidly believes this to be important. Corrected by the White Rabbit nevertheless he becomes confused over the terms important and unimportant, unable to tell the difference. The White Rabbit notifies the court of a letter written by the Knave to somebody. He sings the verses to the court ("They Told me you had been to her..."). Upon finishing, the King declares that the letter is the best evidence they've had all day. Alice eats a tart, hungry, and grows to the size of the court. interrupting the King, she explains that there isn't any meaning to the verses. The King over-analyses them, seeing meaning where there is none. He calls for the Jury to consider their verdict. The Queen roars that the sentence should be given first. Incredulous at the idea, Alice spars with the Queen, causing the Queen to call for her head. A pack of cards rise up seemingly from nowhere and attack Alice.

Epilogue 
Her Sisters, playing chess across the room, suddenly look up, worried, at Alice. Alice tries to tell her sisters her dream but Edith, the younger of the two, is more excited by the fact it has just started to snow outside.

Act 2

Main characters and cast members

Musical numbers

Act 1: Alice's adventures in Wonderland                                                                               
 "Golden afternoon" - Dodgson, Duckworth, Alice Liddell, Lorina Liddell, Edith Liddell and Company                
 "Down, Down, Down" - Company
 "How Doth the Little Crocodile..." - Alice, Crocodile Voice
 "Fury Said to a Mouse..." - Mouse and Company
 "You are Old Father William...." - Father William, Youth
 "Wow! Wow! Wow!" - Duchess, Cook, Baby, Cheshire Cat and Company
 "Twinkle, Twinkle, Little Bat" - Hatter 
 "The Lobster Quadrille" - Mock Turtle, Gryphon and Company
 "Beautiful Soup" - Mock Turtle, Gryphon and Company
 "The Queen of Hearts..." - White Rabbit
 "They told me you had been to her..." - White Rabbit

Act 2: Through the Looking-Glass 
 "Moonlight on the Mirror" - Alice and Company
 "The Jabberwocky" - Alice, Father, Youth and Company
 "Tweedle-Dum and Tweedle-Dee..." - Alice and Company
 "The Walrus and the Carpenter" - Tweedle-Dum, Tweedle-Dee, Walrus, Carpenter and Company
 "Humpty Dumpty..." - Alice
 "In Winter when the fields are White..." - Humpty Dumpty
 "The Lion and the Unicorn..." -  Company
 "Haddocks Eyes (A-sitting on a Gate)" - White Knight, Aged Aged Man
 "Welcome Queen Alice" - White Rabbit and Company
 "Hushaby Lady" - Red Queen, White Queen, Alice
 "Golden Afternoon (Reprise) - Dodgson, Duckworth, Alice Liddell, Lorina Liddell, Edith Liddell and Company

Critical reception 
The review in The Independent called the original 2001 Royal Shakespeare Company production "a magic-free tundra of non-idiosyncrasy" and its Alice, played by Katherine Heath, "charmless". The Guardian thought it faithful to Carroll's text, but called it a game of two halves, Wonderland working well enough, but that Looking-Glass went "off the boil."

Revivals 
The play received a significant revival at the Chichester Festival Theatre in 2010 by the Youth Theatre. This revival, unlike its premiere, received more positive reviews, the Angus noting Emily Dyble's "delightful" performance as Alice. The 2022 revival by ARTComedia and Jersey Arts centre also received a positive response, with the Bailwick Express Jersey observing "The sheer scale of the madness played out over the two hours beggars any kind of coherent description, as it should."

The play has become popular with amateur and university groups, due to its licensing availability, and is now among the most popular stage adaptations of Carroll's tales to be produced in community theatres.

References

Works based on Alice in Wonderland
2001 plays
Plays based on novels